Arrol Corelli is an Indian music composer. He made his debut in the Tamil film Pisaasu (2014) directed by Mysskin and produced by director Bala's B Studios.

Early life and career
Arrol Corelli was born and brought up in Maraimalainagar near Chennai in a middle-class family. He started learning Indian classical violin at the age of five under Shri. Ravi Kumar and later on under Kumari A. Kanyakumari. At a very young age, he started performing in various concerts across south India, winning prizes in competitions held at The Music Academy, Narada Gana Sabha and Mylapore Fine Arts etc. He started learning Western classical piano at the age of ten from the Trinity College of Music, London. He did his schooling at Shri Anand Jain Vidhyala, Tambaram and became a qualified Chartered Accountant in the year 2008.

He approached film director Mysskin who hired him to score the music for Pisaasu produced by director Bala. As Arul is not an uncommon name, Mysskin also suggested the stage name Arrol Corelli, after the Italian composer Arcangelo Corelli, who was also a violinist.

Corelli wrote the background music for Pisaasu; in the film he also played the violin in the song "Nathi pogum koozhangal payanam".  Corelli was nominated in the Best Background Score category at the 2015 Vijay Awards for Pisaasu.

Corelli subsequently received an offer to work with director Pandiraj's Pasanga 2 - Haiku produced by actor Suriya's 2D Entertainment. The soundtrack features four songs and a theme music, the lyrics for which were written by Na. Muthukumar, Madhan Karky and Yugabharathi.

Filmography

 The films are listed in the order that the music released, regardless of the dates the film released.
 The year next to the title of the affected films indicates the release year of the either dubbed or remade version in the named language later than the original version.
 • indicates original language release. Indicates simultaneous makes, if featuring in more languages
 ♦ indicates a remade version, the remaining ones being dubbed versions

Released soundtracks

Upcoming projects

Web series

References

Living people
Tamil musicians
Tamil film score composers
1985 births
Musicians from Chennai